Two Birds is the debut studio album by American drag queen, actor, and singer Trixie Mattel, released in 2017.

Track listing

Track listing adapted from iTunes.

Charts

References

2017 debut albums
Country albums by American artists
Trixie Mattel albums
Self-released albums
Country folk albums